The Roger Award For The Worst Transnational Corporation Operating in New Zealand was an annual media campaign run since 1997 by two activist organisations, Campaign Against Foreign Control of Aotearoa and GATT Watchdog. The winners were chosen by a group of academics, activists, businesspeople and trade unionists.

In April 2018 it was announced the 2016 Roger Award would be the final award, due to a declining number of nominations.

Background
The awards bear the name of former New Zealand Finance Minister Sir Roger Douglas, who introduced far reaching market-oriented reforms in the 1980s (also taken into account during the naming decision were New Zealand Business Roundtable director Roger Kerr, the verb "to roger", and the term "Jolly Roger"). These changes, reinforced by successor Ruth Richardson in the 1990s, made the country's economy one of the most open in the world. Through this period, the role and profile of multinational companies increased. The privatisation of Tranz Rail and Telecom New Zealand, companies that have won multiple Roger Awards, remain particularly controversial - since being given their first awards, they have been re-nationalised and unbundled respectively.

The Roger Award has been used as the model for similar campaigns overseas.

Criteria
The winner was selected by evaluation of the judges made on four criteria, "Economic dominance"; "Impact on people"; "Environmental damage and abuse of animals"; and "Political interference". This last criterion was judged on the basis of whether the nominee is "running an ideological crusade".

Having "won" on three occasions, Tranz Rail was inducted into the 'Hall of Shame' in 2003. It has ceased to exist having been absorbed by Toll NZ, a two-time nominee, and subsequently nationalised as KiwiRail by the Fifth Labour Government of New Zealand. Telecom New Zealand was nominated each year since 1997, and has since been succeeded by Chorus Limited and Spark New Zealand.

Past winners

References

External links
CAFCA - Roger Awards

Ironic and humorous awards
New Zealand awards
Awards established in 1997